Tangled in Dream is the second album by the Australian progressive metal band Vanishing Point. On the Australian release of the CD, the track On the Turning Away originally by Pink Floyd is included as a bonus track.

Track listing
 "Surreal" - 6:01
 "Samsara" - 4:12
 "Closer Apart" - 5:42
 "Bring on the Rain" - 6:31
 "Never Walk Away" - 8:16
 "The Real You" - 5:24
 "Two Minds and One Soul" - 4:11
 "I Will Awake" - 6:02
 "Dancing With the Devil" - 4:32
 "Father (7 Years)" - 8:06
 "Tangled in a Dream" - 2:46
 "On The Turning Away" - 3:26

Credits

Band members
 Joe Del Mastro − bass
 Danny Olding - keyboards
 Jack Lukic − drums
 Silvio Massaro − vocals
 Chris Porcianko  − guitar
 Tom Vucur − guitar

Guest musicians
 Pep Sammartino − Backing Vocals
 Gio Caveliere - Backing Vocals
 Dorina Morelli - Backing Vocals

2000 albums
Vanishing Point (band) albums
Limb Music albums